Robert Lee Wai-wang is a Hong Kong businessman and politician who has been serving as the member of the Legislative Council for Financial Services since 2022. In the 2021 election, he received more votes than the incumbent legislator, Christopher Cheung, and took the seat.

In October 2022, despite ongoing restrictions when flying into Hong Kong for normal residents, Lee said in reference to the Global Financial Leaders' Investment Summit that "Hong Kong is open for business. I think that message should be loud and clear."

Electoral history

References 

Living people
Year of birth missing (living people)
HK LegCo Members 2022–2025
Hong Kong pro-Beijing politicians